Tanatar (Tañatar) is a rural locality (a village) in Novozirgansky Selsoviet, Khaybullinsky District, Bashkortostan, Russia. The population was 12 as of 2010. There is 1 street.

Geography 
Tanatar is located 14 km southeast of Akyar (the district's administrative centre) by road. Novy Zirgan is the nearest rural locality.

References 

Rural localities in Khaybullinsky District